Melikyan or Melikian is an Armenian surname. It may refer to:

 Anna Melikian (born 1976), Russian-Armenian film and TV director, producer, and writer
 Arsen Melikyan (born 1976), Armenian weightlifter
 Hayk Melikyan (born 1980), Armenian pianist
 Papken Melikian (born 1960), Lebanese-Armenian footballer
 Romanos Melikian (1883–1935), Armenian composer
 Siouzana Melikián (born 1986), Mexican actress
 Sofya Melikyan (born 1978), Armenian pianist
 Yegishe Melikyan (born 1979), Armenian footballer

See also 
 Melikian-Ouzounian School (1921–1953) in Cyprus, founded by the Melikyan family
 Melikov, the Russified version of Melikyan

Armenian-language surnames